This is a list of Bulgarian football transfers for the 2020 summer transfer window. Only transfers involving a team from the two professional leagues, First League and Second League are listed.

First League

Arda

In:

Out:

Beroe

In:

Out:

Botev Plovdiv

In:

Out:

Botev Vratsa

In:

Out:

Cherno More

In:

Out:

CSKA Sofia

In:

Out:

CSKA 1948

In:

Out:

Etar

In:

Out:

Levski Sofia

In:

Out:

Lokomotiv Plovdiv

In:

Out:

Ludogorets

In:

Out:

Montana

In:

Out:

Slavia Sofia

In:

Out:

Tsarsko Selo

In:

 
 

Out:

Second League

Dobrudzha

In:

Out:

Hebar

In:

Out:

Kariana

In:

Out:

Litex

In:

Out:

Lokomotiv GO

In:

Out:

Lokomotiv Sofia

In:

Out:

Ludogorets II

In:

Out:

Minyor Pernik

In:

Out:

Neftochimic

In:

Out:

Pirin Blagoevgrad

In:

Out:

Septemvri Simitli

In:

Out:

Septemvri Sofia

In:

Out:

Sozopol

In:

Out:

Sportist

In:

Out:

Strumska Slava

In:

Out:

Vitosha

In:

Out:

Yantra

In:

Out:

References

Bulgaria
Summer 2020